Angela Carluccio (born 26 October 1972 in Brindisi) is an Italian politician.

She ran for the office of Mayor of Brindisi at the 2016 local elections, supported by a centrist coalition. She won and took her office on 22 June 2016. She resigned after a motion of no confidence and left office on 27 May 2017.

Carluccio is the first woman to be elected Mayor of Brindisi.

See also
2016 Italian local elections
List of mayors of Brindisi

References

External links
 

1972 births
Living people
Mayors of Brindisi